During the 2008–09 season, Bayer 04 Leverkusen competed in the Bundesliga.

Season summary
Leverkusen dropped further down the table to finish 9th, failing to qualify for European competition for a second consecutive year. Manager Bruno Labbadia left Leverkusen at the end of the season for Hamburg, and was replaced by erstwhile Bayern Munich caretaker Jupp Heynckes.

Players

First-team squad
Squad at end of season

Left club during season

Notes

References

Bayer 04 Leverkusen seasons
Bayer Leverkusen